Zhongxiao Road (also called 4th Blvd. or Chunghsiao Road) is a major arterial boulevard that is part of provincial highway 5 in Taipei, Taiwan, connecting the Zhongzheng district in the west with the Daan, Songshan, Xinyi, and Nangang districts in the east. Zhongxiao Road is known as a popular shopping and entertainment area, with many large department stores and shopping malls located along most of the entire stretch. About half of the Nangang Line of the Taipei Metro runs under the road, with stations located at major intersections along the road, which accounts for the significant pedestrian traffic along the road. The majority of the road is 8-10 lanes wide with a median dividing the road. At the intersection with Zhongshan Road, there is a two-lane underpass for traffic on Zhongxiao Road to bypass the intersection.

Notable landmarks along Zhongxiao Road include:
 Taipei North Gate, originally one of the gates of the Walls of Taipei
 Taipei Main Station
 Shin Kong Life Tower
 Control Yuan
 Executive Yuan
 Shandao Temple
 National Taipei University of Technology
 Sun Yat-sen Memorial Hall

Sections 
Zhongxiao Road is divided into east and west sections, as determined by Zhongshan Road, with two numbered sections in the west section and seven numbered sections in the east.

Zhongxiao West Road
 Section 1: Zhongshan Road - Zhonghua Road
 Section 2: Zhonghua Road - Huanhe Road/Zhongxiao Bridge (to Sanchong District)

Zhongxiao East Road

 Section 1: Zhongshan Road - Hangzhou Road
 Section 2: Hangzhou Road - Xinsheng Road
 Section 3: Xinsheng Road - Fuxing Road
 Section 4: Fuxing Road - Keelung Road
 Section 5: Keelung Road - Yongji Road
 Section 6: Yongji Road - Shiangyang Road
 Section 7: Shiangyang Road - Academia Road

Major intersections

Zhongxiao West Road
 Zhongshan Road
 Gongyuan Road
 Chongqing Road
 Boai Road (3rd Ave)
 Zhonghua Road
 Huanhe Road

Zhongxiao East Road
 Zhongshan Road
 Linsen Road
 Bade Road
 Xinsheng Road/Expressway
 Jianguo Road/Expressway
 Fuxing Road
 Dunhua Road
 Yanji Street
 Guangfu Road
 Keelung Road
 Songshan Road
 Yongji Road
 Dongxin Road
 Shiangyang Road

In popular culture
4th Boulevard (Zhongxaio E. Road) is frequently the theme or mentioned in literature or Taiwanese popular music lyrics or titles.

See also
 List of roads in Taiwan

Streets in Taipei

zh:忠孝西路